Renn is a both a surname and given name. It may refer to:

Surname
Crystal Renn (born 1986), American model and author
Jürgen Renn (born 1956), German science historian, physicist, and Director at the Max Planck Institute for the History of Science
Ludwig Renn (1889–1979), German author
Mark Renn (1952–2019), British sculptor and muralist
Nancy Lapp (née Renn; born 1930), American archeologist, biblical scholar, and museum curator
Olaf Renn (born 1969), German footballer
Samuel Renn (1786–1845), English pipe organ builder and businessman
W. S. Renn Jr. (born 1928), American football coach
Rev. Joseph John Renn b. 12 Jun 1839, d. 2 Jan 1906, fought during the American Civil War and was captured and imprisoned in Almira New York where he reportedly and thereafter pursued being a pastor. He was much later involved as an educator at a college connected with Duke University in North Carolina.  His grandfather, Joseph, fought during the American Revolution and served under Captain William Waters 1st Artillery Regiment

In fiction
Max Renn, a leading role in the 1983 film Videodrome
Singer Renn, a character in The Echorium Sequence trilogy of novels (1999–2003), by Katherine Roberts [see: Characters in The Echorium Sequence]

First and middle name
Amaryllis Collymore (middle name Renn; 1745 or 1750–1828), Afro-Barbadian sugar plantation and slave owner, businesswoman, and manumitted slave
Renn Crichlow (born 1968), Canadian kayaker, canoeist, Olympics competitor, and orthopedic surgeon
Renn Hampden (1793–1868), English Anglican clergyman and divinity professor
Renn Hampden (died 1852), British politician; Member of Parliament
Renn Hawkey (born 1974), American musician, songwriter, film producer, and actor
Renn Kiriyama (born 1985), Japanese actor
Renn Woods (born 1958), American actor, vocalist, and songwriter

See also
Ren (disambiguation)
Renn Fayre (originally Renaissance Fayre), an annual festival held at Reed College in Portland, Oregon, USA
Rennie (disambiguation)